Bike Calgary is a member-based, non-profit organization based in Calgary, Alberta, Canada. With over 1,300 active members, it is the city’s largest advocacy group for utility cycling and active transportation.

History 
Bike Calgary was formed as an informal group of cyclists in 2005 and at first existed mainly as a website that served to disseminate information on cycling in Calgary, and incorporated as a non-profit society in 2008. In 2011, under the guidance of CivicCamp, Bike Calgary began to take on a broader advocacy role.

Initiatives 
Bike Calgary lobbied Calgary Transit to allow folding bicycles on buses and trains at all times, which it now does.  It has also been involved in the implementation of Calgary's Cycling Strategy.
In 2014, it led a successful campaign to implement a pilot network of protected bike lanes in Downtown Calgary and the Beltline.

Cycling courses 
Bike Calgary has developed and offers a one-day Urban Cycling Skills course for a nominal fee.  It is based on the CAN-BIKE curriculum.

Annual YYC Bike Awards
The Lawrence Hong Advocacy Award
Commuter of the Year
Business of the Year
School of the Year

See also 
 Transportation in Calgary

References

External links 
 

Organizations based in Calgary
Cycling organizations in Canada